This is a list of Argentinian films of 2011 organized by theatrical release date.

See also
2011 in Argentina

References

Films
Argentina
2011